José Florindo Aceituno Fernandes (4 January 1937 – 16 May 2002) was a Chilean long-distance runner. He competed in the men's 5000 metres at the 1960 Summer Olympics.

References

External links
 

1937 births
2002 deaths
Athletes (track and field) at the 1960 Summer Olympics
Chilean male long-distance runners
Olympic athletes of Chile